Rum Mehmed Pasha (1466–d. 1470) was an Ottoman statesman, known for being the grand vizier of the Ottoman Empire from 1466 to 1469 and the main rival of Mahmud Pasha Angelović. As his name suggests, he was of Greek descent.

Upon the urging of Karamanlı Mehmet Pasha, Sultan Mehmed II the Conqueror dismissed Rum Mehmed Pasha from office in 1469 and had him executed by drowning in 1470.

See also 
 List of Ottoman Grand Viziers

References 

15th-century Grand Viziers of the Ottoman Empire
Devshirme
Grand Viziers of Mehmed the Conqueror
Executed people from the Ottoman Empire
People from the Ottoman Empire of Greek descent
15th-century executions by the Ottoman Empire
1470 deaths
Year of birth missing
Greek Muslims